James F. Jones Jr. (born May 15, 1934) is a former Democratic member of the Pennsylvania House of Representatives.

He was born in Pen Argyl in 1934.

References

Democratic Party members of the Pennsylvania House of Representatives
Living people
1934 births